The Seahorse Islands is a chain of long and narrow sandy islands in western North Slope Borough, Alaska, United States. The shape of these coastal islands has changed over the years.

The Seahorse Islands were named by Captain Frederick William Beechey in 1826. Beechey had sent out his barge to explore the coastline further north. It reached the islands on August 21, 1826. Beechey, writing later, said: "On the 21st they arrived off a chain of sandy islands... which I have distinguished by the name of the Sea Horse Islands." "Sea Horse" is an antiquated term for the walrus.

See also 
 List of islands of Alaska

References

External links 
 USGS

Islands of Alaska
Islands of North Slope Borough, Alaska
Islands of the Chukchi Sea